Gerard Heinz (born Gerhard Hinze; 2 January 1904 – 20 November 1972) was a German actor.

Heinz was born in Hamburg, Germany and later moved to Britain, where he changed his name. He appeared in almost 60 films (including Caravan), and a number of stage productions. In the original 1942 production of Terence Rattigan's Flare Path, he played Count Skriczevinsky, a Polish pilot serving with the RAF in World War II.

A relationship with Joan Rodker, daughter of the modernist poet John Rodker, resulted in the birth of a son, Ernest, in Odessa in 1937. After their separation, Heinz married the actress Mary Kenton. They played respectively Mr. and Mrs. Serafin in the 1961 episode "Washday S.O.S." of the TV series The Cheaters. They also performed together in the TV series The Sullavan Brothers, and in the ITC crime drama series The Four Just Men, and a number of other films.

Filmography

 Thunder Rock (1942) – Hans Harma (uncredited)
 Went the Day Well? (1942) – Schmidt (uncredited)
 English Without Tears (1944) – Polish Officer 
 Caravan (1946) – Don Carlos
 Frieda (1947) – Polish Priest
 The First Gentleman (1948) – Dr. Stockmar
 Broken Journey (1948) – Joseph Romer
 The Fallen Idol (1948) – Ambassador
 Sleeping Car to Trieste (1948) – Ambassador
 Portrait from Life (1948) – Heine
 That Dangerous Age (1949) – Dr. Thorvald
 The Bad Lord Byron (1949) – Austrian Officer
 The Lost People (1949) – Professor
 State Secret (1950) – Tomasi Bendel
 The Clouded Yellow (1950) – Dr. Karl Cesare
 Traveller's Joy (1950) – Helstrom
 White Corridors (1951) – Dr. Macuzek
 His Excellency (1952) – Prime Minister
 Private Information (1952) – Alex Hartmann
 Top Secret (1952) – Russian Director of Plant
 Desperate Moment (1953) – German Prison Doctor
 The Cruel Sea (1953) – Polish Captain 
 The Prisoner (1955) – The Doctor
 You Pay Your Money (1957) – Dr. Burger
 Seven Thunders (1957) – Von Kronitz
 The Mark of the Hawk (1957) – Governor General
 The Man Inside (1958) – Robert Stone
 The House of the Seven Hawks (1959) – Inspector Sluiter
 I Aim at the Stars (1960) – Professor Oberth
 Offbeat (1961) – Jake
 Highway to Battle (1961) – Constantin
 The Guns of Navarone (1961) – German Surgeon (uncredited)
 Operation Snatch (1962) – Col. Waldock
 Mystery Submarine (1963) – German Admiral
 Boy with a Flute (1964)
 Operation Crossbow (1965) – German Officer (uncredited)
 Devils of Darkness (1965) – Bouvier
 The Heroes of Telemark (1965) – Enhardt
 The Projected Man (1966) – Prof. Lembach
 Where the Bullets Fly (1966) – Venstram
 The Dirty Dozen (1967) – Card-Playing German Officer (uncredited) 
 Venom (aka The Legend of Spider Forest) (1971) – Huber

References

External links

1904 births
1972 deaths
Male actors from Hamburg
English male film actors
English male stage actors
English male television actors
20th-century English male actors
German male television actors
German male film actors
German male stage actors
20th-century German male actors
German emigrants to the United Kingdom